Clifton Waugh (born 10 September 1972 in Port Maria, St Mary, Jamaica) is a Jamaican soccer defender who currently plays for Harbour View FC.

Club career
A big defender, Waugh played two years at Virginia Commonwealth University and for Olympic Gardens before moving to Harbour View. Also, he was loaned out to Richmond Kickers for their 2001 season.

International career
He has also appeared for the 'Reggae Boyz', making his debut in 1998 against Saudi Arabia and playing his last international in 2000 against Japan. He just missed out on Jamaica's 1998 World Cup squad but did travel with the team to France.

External links
 Profile at Harbourview
 Profile at Golocaljamaica

References

1972 births
Living people
Jamaican footballers
Jamaica international footballers
Richmond Kickers players
USL First Division players
Harbour View F.C. players
Association football defenders
National Premier League players
People from Saint Mary Parish, Jamaica
Olympic Gardens F.C. players